WXEX may refer to:
WXEX (AM), a radio station (1540 kHz) licensed to Exeter, New Hampshire, United States
WXEX-FM, a radio station (92.1 MHz) licensed to Sanford, Maine, United States
WRIC-TV, a television station (Channel 22) licensed to Petersburg, Virginia, United States which held the call sign WXEX-TV from 1955-April 23, 1990
WEAN-FM: a radio station (99.7 MHz) licensed to Wakefield-Peacedale, Rhode Island, which held the callsign WXEX around 1998